The following is a list of Australian divisions in World War I, including all infantry and mounted divisions of the Australian Army during that conflict. During the war, Australia raised an all volunteer force for overseas service, known as the Australian Imperial Force, which subsequently served in several theatres, including the Gallipoli Campaign, the Sinai and Palestine Campaign and on the Western Front in France and Belgium. Between the start of the war in August 1914 and its end in November 1918, Australia raised a total of seven infantry divisions, one of which – the New Zealand and Australian Division – was also manned by New Zealanders. Of these, six took part in combat, while one – the 6th – was broken up in the United Kingdom and disbanded in September 1917 before being deployed due to manpower shortages. In addition, there were two mounted divisions raised: the ANZAC Mounted Division and the Australian Mounted Division.

Divisions

See also
List of military divisions

References
Citations

Bibliography
 
 
 
 

Australian Divisions
World War I
 
World War I